is a former Nippon Professional Baseball player. He played for the Tohoku Rakuten Golden Eagles, and was also previously with the Osaka Kintetsu Buffaloes.

External links

Japan Baseball Daily

Living people
1976 births
People from Takatsuki, Osaka
Japanese baseball players
Nippon Professional Baseball pitchers
Osaka Kintetsu Buffaloes players
Tohoku Rakuten Golden Eagles players